José María Galeano (born 18 November 1979) is a Spanish actor, best known for his roles as Father Tomás in Televisa's daytime drama Que te perdone Dios, and as Braulio Padilla in Telemundo's La Doña.

Biography 
Galeano studied political science and sociology at the University of Granada. He later moved to Madrid to study acting, and lived there for 11 years.

Filmography

Film roles

Television roles

Awards and nominations

References

External links 
 

1979 births
21st-century Spanish male actors
Living people
People from Algeciras
Spanish expatriates in Mexico
Spanish male film actors